Sebastián Antonio Méndez Plaza (born June 6, 1986 in Quilpué, Chile) is a Chilean former footballer who played as a midfielder.

Teams
  Santiago Wanderers 2005–2015
  San Marcos 2015–2018
  San Luis 2019

National team
  Chile U23 2008

References

External links
 Profile at BDFA 
 
 Sebastián Méndez at MemoriaWanderers.cl 

1986 births
Living people
People from Quilpué
Chilean footballers
Chile youth international footballers
Santiago Wanderers footballers
San Marcos de Arica footballers
San Luis de Quillota footballers
Chilean Primera División players
Primera B de Chile players
Association football midfielders